The 2nd Annual Latin American Music Awards were held at the Dolby Theatre in Los Angeles, California. It was broadcast live on Telemundo. Lucero was announced as the host on August 31. Banda MS and Yandel led the nominations with six each.

Performances
CNCO
Gerardo Ortiz
Gente de Zona
Jesse & Joy
Prince Royce
Jay Ruiz
Víctor Manuelle
Dvicio
Lucero
Pitbull
Sofía Reyes
Banda MS
Flo Rida
Miguel Bosé
Joey Montana
Alvaro Soler
Baby Rasta & Gringo
Franco de Vita
La Santa Cecilia
Becky G
Nicky Jam
ChocQuibTown
LunchMoney Lewis
Jacob Forever
Aymee Nuviola

Nominees
The nominations were announced on August 31.

Multiple nominations and awards

References

External links 

 Official site in Facebook
 Official site in Instagram
 Official site in Twitter

2016 music awards
2016 in Latin music
2016 in Los Angeles